Timothy Lake is a lake about  southeast of Portland, Oregon, United States. It is in proximity to Clear Lake and an impoundment of the Oak Grove Fork Clackamas River.

The compacted-earth Timothy Lake Dam was built by Portland General Electric in 1956 to regulate seasonal water flow to Lake Harriet downstream.  The dam, 110 feet high and impounding 81,000 acre-feet, does not generate any hydroelectric power itself.  In the summer, the lake is a very popular destination for camping, boating, hiking, horseback riding, and mountain biking.

See also
List of lakes in Oregon

References

External links
Timothy Lake south of Mount Hood beckons hikers who like loops - The Oregonian

Reservoirs in Oregon
Lakes of Clackamas County, Oregon
Mount Hood National Forest
Dams in Oregon
Portland General Electric dams
Protected areas of Clackamas County, Oregon
1956 establishments in Oregon